Bob Christian (born May 11, 1946) is a retired American basketball player.

He played collegiately for the Grambling State University Tigers.

He was selected by the Atlanta Hawks in the 8th round (109th pick overall) of the 1969 NBA draft.

He played for the Dallas Chaparrals and New York Nets (1969–70) in the ABA for 2 games and for the Hawks (1970–73) and Phoenix Suns (1973–74) in the NBA for 246 games.

External links

1946 births
Living people
American men's basketball players
Atlanta Hawks draft picks
Atlanta Hawks players
Centers (basketball)
Dallas Chaparrals players
Grambling State Tigers men's basketball players
New York Nets players
Phoenix Suns players